The list of hull classifications comprises an alphabetical list of the hull classification symbols used by the United States Navy to identify the type of a ship.

The combination of symbol and hull number identify a modern Navy ship uniquely. A heavily modified or repurposed ship may receive a new symbol, and either retain the hull number or receive a new one.  Also, the system of symbols has changed a number of times since it was introduced in 1907, so ships' symbols sometimes change without anything being done to the physical ship.

Many of the symbols listed here are not presently in use. The Naval Vessel Register maintains an online database of U.S. Navy ships.

The 1975 ship reclassification of cruisers, frigates, and ocean escorts brought U.S. Navy classifications into line with other nations' classifications, and eliminated the perceived "cruiser gap" with the Soviet Navy.

If a ship's hull classification symbol has "T-" preceding it, that symbolizes that it is a ship of the Military Sealift Command, with a primarily civilian crew.

A 

 AALC:  Amphibious Assault Landing Craft
 AARCS:  Air Raid Report Control Ship
 AASGP:  Amphibious Assault Ship, General Purpose
 AB:  Crane Ship
 ABD: Advance base dock
 ABSD: Advance base section dock
 ABU:  Boom defence vessel
 AC:  Collier
 ACM:  Auxiliary Mine Layer
 ACR:  Armored cruiser (pre-1920)
 ACS:  Auxiliary crane ship
 ACV:  Auxiliary Aircraft Carrier (Escort carrier) (1942)
 AD:  Destroyer tender
 ADC:  Ammunition Storage Cargo ship
 ADG:  Degaussing/Deperming Ship (ADG = Auxiliary Degaussing/Deperming General)
 ADS:  Air Defense Ship
 AE:  Ammunition ship
 AEFS: Fleet replenishment ship
 AEM:  Ammunition Ship, Missile (retired)
 AF:  Refrigerated ship
 AFD:  Auxiliary floating dry dock
 AFDB:  Large auxiliary floating dry dock
 AFDL:  Small auxiliary floating dry dock
 AFDM:  Medium auxiliary floating dry dock
 AFDS:  Auxiliary Fighter Directing Ship
 AFS:  Combat Stores Ship
 AFSB: Afloat Forward Staging Base (also AFSB(I) for "interim", changed to ESB for Expeditionary Mobile Dock)
 AG:  Miscellaneous Auxiliary (AG = Auxiliary General)
 AGB:  Icebreaker
 AGC:  Auxiliary general communication ship, or amphibious force flagship (now LCC)
 AGCL:  Auxiliary General Communication (ship), Light
 AGD:  Dredge Ship
 AGDE:  Testing Ocean Escort
 AGDS:  Deep Submergence Support Ship
 AGE:  General Purpose Experimental Ship (AGE = Auxiliary General Experimental)
 AGEH:  hydrofoil research ship
 AGER:  Environmental Research Ship
 AGF:  Miscellaneous Command Ship
 AGFF:  Testing Frigate
 AGH:  Weather Ship (AGH = Auxiliary General Hydrometeorology)
 AGHS: Hydroplane research ship
 AGI:  Intelligence Collecting Ship (Spy ship, AGI = Auxiliary General Intelligence)
 AGL:  Mooring/buoy tender
 AGM:  Missile Range Instrumentation Ship
 AGMR:  Auxiliary Major Communication Relay Ship
 AGOR:  Oceanographic Research Ship
 AGOS:  Ocean Surveillance Ship
 AGP:  Patrol Craft Tender
 AGR:  Radar Picket Ship (retired)
 AGS:  Survey ship
 AGSC: Coastal survey craft
 AGSL:  Auxiliary General Satellite Launching ship
 AGSS:  Auxiliary Submarine
 AGT:  Target ship (AGT = Auxiliary General Target)
 AGTR:  Technical research ship
 AH:  Hospital ship
 AHC:  Auxiliary Helicopter carrier
 AHP:  Medical Evacuation Ship
 AIRIS:  Aviation store issue ship
 AK:  Cargo Ship
 AKA:  Attack Cargo Ship
 AKB:  Cargo Ship, Barge
 AKD:  Cargo Ship, Dock (cargo dock ship)
 AKE:  Underway Replenishment Dry Cargo Ship
 AKF:  Float-on/Float-off (flo-flo) Ship
 AKFBM:  Fleet ballistic missile trial ship
 AKI:  Store Issue Ship
 AKL:  Cargo Ship, Light
 AKN:  Cargo Ship, Net laying
 AKR:  Vehicle Cargo Ship (Cargo Ship, Roll-on/Roll-off)
 AKS:  General stores issue ship
 AKSS:  Cargo submarine
 AKV:  Cargo Ship, Aircraft Transport
 AKX:  Container ship
 AL:  Auxiliary Lighter
 AM:  Minesweeper or MCM tender
 AMb:  Harbor Minesweeper
 AMc:  Coastal Minesweeper
 AMCU:  Underwater Mine Locater
 AMh:  Harbor Minesweeper 
 AMS:  Motor Minesweeper 
 AN:  Net Laying Ship
 ANL:  Net Laying Ship
 AO:  Fleet Oiler
 AOE:  Fast Combat Support Ship
 AOG:  Gasoline Tanker
 AOR:  Replenishment Oiler
 AOS:  Specialized Oiler/Tanker
 AOSS:  Submarine Oiler (retired)
 AOT:  Transport/Storage Oiler
 AP:  Transport
 APA:  Attack Transport
 APB:  Self-Propelled Barracks ship
 APb:  Base repair ship
 APC:  Transport, Coastal
 APD:  High Speed Transport
 APF:  Administrative flagship
 APG:  Coastal artillery supply ship
 APH:  Ambulance Transport
 APL:  Barracks Craft, non self-propelled
 APM:  Artillery Transport
 APN:  Artillery Transport, non Self-Propelled
 APP:  Troop Barge
 APR:  Cargo ship, rescue / med evac
 APS:  Minelaying Submarine (retired)
 APSS:  Transport Submarine (retired)
 APT:  Troop transport
 APV:  Aircraft transport
 APY:  Large Y-boat (large Rigid-hulled inflatable boat)
 AR:  Repair ship
 ARb: base repair ship
 ARB: Repair Ship, Battle damage
 ARC:  Cable Repair Ship
 ARD:  Auxiliary Repair Dry Dock
 ARDC:  Auxiliary Repair Dry Dock, Concrete
 ARDM:  Medium Auxiliary Repair Dry Dock
 ARG:  Marine engine repair ship
 ARH:  Heavy repair ship (ARH = Auxiliary Repair, Heavy)
 ARIS:  Space exploration tracking ship
 ARL:  Small Repair Ship (ARL = Auxiliary Repair, Light)
 ARM:  Heavy machinery repair ship (ARM = Auxiliary Repair, Machinery, heavy)
 ARR:  Repair ship, radioactive
 ARS:  Rescue/Salvage Ship
 ARSD:  Salvage Lifting Ship
 ARST:  Auxiliary Rescue Salvage Tender
 ARV:  Aircraft repair ship
 ARVA:  Aircraft repair ship, airframe
 ARVE:  Aviation engine repair ship
 ARVH:  Helicopter repair ship
 AS:  Submarine tender
 ASE:  Submarine ammunition supply ship
 ASPB:  Assault Support Patrol Boat
 ASR:  Submarine Rescue Ship
 ASSA:  Cargo Submarine
 ASSP:  Transport Submarine (retired)
 AT:  Ocean Going Tug
 ATA:  Auxiliary Ocean Tug
 ATC:  Armored Troop Carrier
 ATF:  Fleet Ocean Tug
 ATO:  Auxiliary Tug, Old
 ATR:  Rescue tug (ATR = Auxiliary Tug, Rescue)
 ATS:  Salvage and Rescue Ship
 AV:  Seaplane Tender
 AVB:  Aviation Logistics Support Ship
 AVC:  Large catapult lighter (for launching seaplanes)
 AVD:  Seaplane Tender Destroyer (retired)
 AVG:  Auxiliary Aircraft Ferry (Escort carrier) (1941-2)
 AVM:  Missile trial ship
 AVP:  Seaplane Tender, light
 AVR:  Aircraft Rescue Ship
 AVS:  Helicopter training ship
 AVT:  Auxiliary Aircraft Landing Training Ship
 AW:  Distilling Ship
 AWK:  Water Tanker
 AWT:  Water Tanker
 AX:  Training ship
 AXS:  Training ship, sail
 AXT:  Training ship tender
 AZ:  Airship Tender (retired)

B
B:  Battleship (pre-1920)
BB:  Battleship
BM:  Monitor (retired)

C 

 C:  Cruiser (pre-1920 Protected Cruisers and Peace Cruisers)
 CA:  (first series) Cruiser (retired, composed all surviving pre-1920 Protected and Peace Cruisers)
 CA:  (second series) Heavy Cruiser, category later renamed Gun Cruiser (retired)
 CAG:  Heavy Cruiser, Guided Missile (retired)
 CB:  Large cruiser (retired)
 CBC:  Large Command Cruiser (retired, never used operationally)
 CC:  Battlecruiser (retired, never used operationally)
 CC:  (second usage) Command Cruiser (retired); cruiser
 CG:  Guided Missile Cruiser
 CGN:  Guided Missile Cruiser (Nuclear-Propulsion)
 CL:  Light Cruiser (retired)
 CLAA:  Antiaircraft Cruiser (retired)
 CLG:  Light Cruiser, Guided Missile (retired)
 CLGN:  Light Cruiser, Guided Missile (Nuclear propulsion) (retired)
 CLK:  Hunter-Killer Cruiser (abolished 1951)
 CM:  Minelayer
 CMc:  Coastal Minelayer
 CS:  Scout Cruiser (retired)
 CSGN:  Strike Cruiser (Proposed, never used operationally)
 CV:  Aircraft carrier
 CVA:  Attack Aircraft Carrier (retired)
 CVB:  Large Aircraft Carrier (category merged into CVA, 1952)
 CVE:  Escort aircraft carrier (retired) (1943-retirement of type)
 CVHA:  Assault Helicopter Aircraft Carrier (retired in favor of various L-series amphibious assault ship hull codes)
 CVHE:  Escort Aircraft Carrier, Helicopter (retired)
 CVL:  Light aircraft carrier (retired)
 CVN:  Aircraft Carrier (Nuclear-Propulsion)
 CVS:  Antisubmarine Aircraft Carrier (retired)
 CVT:  Training Aircraft Carrier (changed to AVT (Auxiliary))
 CVU:  Utility Aircraft Carrier (retired)

D 

 D: Destroyer (pre-1920)
 DD:  Destroyer
 DDE:  Escort destroyer (category abolished 1962)
 DDG:  Guided missile destroyer
 DDH:  Helicopter carrier (used by Japan)
 DDK:  Hunter-Killer Destroyer (category merged into DDE, 4 March 1950)
 DDR:  Radar Picket Destroyer (retired)
 DE:  Destroyer Escort (World War II, later became Ocean Escort)
 DE:  Ocean Escort (abolished 30 June 1975)
 DEG:  Guided Missile Ocean Escort (abolished 30 June 1975)
 DER:  Radar Picket Destroyer Escort (abolished 30 June 1975)
 DL:  Destroyer Leader (later Frigate) (retired)
 DLG:  Guided Missile Frigate (abolished 30 June 1975)
 DLGN:  Guided Missile Frigate (Nuclear-Propulsion) (abolished 30 June 1975)
 DM:  Destroyer Minelayer (retired)
 DMS:  Destroyer Minesweeper (retired)
 DSRV:  Deep Submergence Rescue Vehicle
 DSV:  Deep Submergence Vehicle

E 
 ESD:  Expeditionary Transfer Dock
 ESB:  Expeditionary Mobile Base (a variant of ESD, formerly AFSB)
 EPF:  Expeditionary Fast Transport

F 

 FF:  Frigate (retired)
 FFG:  Guided Missile Frigate
 FFH:  Fast Frigate Helo
 FFL:  Light frigate
 FFR:  Radar Picket Frigate (retired)
 FFT:  Frigate (Reserve Training) (retired)
 FS:  Corvette

I 

 IX: Unclassified miscellaneous vessel
 IXSS:  Unclassified Miscellaneous Submarine

J 
JHSV:  Joint High Speed Vessel (changed to EPF)

L 

 LB:  Landing Boat
 LBE:  Landing Barge, Emergency repair
 LBP:  Landing Boat, Personnel
 LBS:  Landing Barge, Support
 LBV:  Landing Boat, Vehicle
 LC:  Landing Craft
 LCA:  Landing Craft Assault
LCA(HR) Landing Craft Assault (Hedgerow)
 LCAC:  Landing Craft, Air Cushioned
 LCB:  Landing Craft, Barge
 LCC:  Landing Craft, Command
 LCE:  Landing Craft, Emergency repair
 LCEOP:  Landing Craft, Engine Overhaul Party
 LCF:  Landing Craft, Flak
 LCFF:  Landing Craft, Flotilla Flagship
 LCG:  Landing Craft, Gun
 LCGL:  Landing Craft, Gun, Large
 LCGM:  Landing Craft, Gun, Medium
 LCH:  Landing Craft, Heavy
 LCI:  Landing Craft, Infantry
 LCIFF:  Landing Craft, Infantry, Flotilla Flagship
 LCIFL:  Landing Craft, Infantry, Flotilla Leader
 LCIG:  Landing Craft, Infantry, Gun
 LCIL:  Landing Craft, Infantry, Large
 LCIM:  Landing Craft, Infantry, Medium
 LCIR:  Landing Craft, Infantry, Rocket
 LCL:  Landing Craft, Logistic
 LCM:  Landing Craft Mechanized
 LCN:  Landing Craft, Navigation
 LCOCU:  Landing Craft, Obstacle Clearing Unit
 LCP: Landing Craft, Personnel
 LCPA: Landing Craft, Personnel, Air-Cushioned
 LCPL:  Landing Craft, Personnel, Large
 LCPM:  Landing Craft, Personnel, Medium
 LCPN:  Landing Craft, Personnel, Nested
 LCPP:  Landing Craft, Personnel, Plastic
 LCPR:  Landing Craft, Personnel, Ramped
 LCPS:  Landing Craft, Personnel, Survey
 LCRL:  Landing Craft, Rubber, Large
 LCPR:  Landing Craft, Rubber, Rocket
 LCRS:  Landing Craft, Rubber, Small
 LCRU:  Landing Craft, Recovery Unit
 LCS:  Littoral Combat Ship
 LCSL:  Landing Craft, Support (Large) (World War II era)
 LCSM:  Landing Craft, Support, Medium
 LCSR:  Landing Craft, Support, Rocket
 LCSS:  Landing Craft, Support, Small
 LCT:  Landing Craft, Tank (World War II era)
 LCTA:  Landing Craft, Tank, Armored
 LCU:  Landing Craft, Utility
 LCV:  Landing Craft, Vehicle
 LCVP: Landing Craft, Vehicle and Personnel
 LES:  Landing boat, support
 LFS:  Amphibious fire support ship
 LHA:  Amphibious Assault Ship (General Purpose)
 LHD:  Amphibious Assault Ship (Multi-Purpose, i.e. added Landing Craft ability versus LHA)
 LKA:  Amphibious Cargo Ship (out of commission)
 LPA:  Landing Platform, Amphibious
 LPD:  Amphibious Transport, Dock (aka Landing Platform, Dock)
 LPH:  Landing Platform, Helicopter (out of commission)
 LPR:  Amphibious transport, small
 LPSS:  Amphibious Transport Submarine (retired)
 LSA:  Landing Ship, Assault
 LSB:  Landing Ship, Bombardment
 LSD:  Landing Ship, Dock
 LSF:  Landing Ship, Flagship
 LSFF:  Landing Ship, Flotilla Flagship
 LSH:  Landing Ship, Heavy or Helicopter
 LSHL:  Landing Ship, Headquarter, Large
 LSI:  Landing Ship, Infantry
 LSIG:  Landing Ship, Infantry, Gun
 LSIL:  Landing Ship, Infantry (Large) (formerly LCIL)
 LSIM:  Landing Ship, Infantry, Medium
 LSIR:  Landing Ship, Infantry, Rocket
 LSL:  Landing Ship, Logistics
 LSM:  Landing Ship, Medium
 LSMR:  Landing Ship, Medium, Rocket
 LSR:  Landing Ship, Rocket
 LSS:  Landing Ship, Support
 LSSL:  Landing Ship, Support (Large) (formerly LCSL)
 LST:  Landing Ship, Tank
 LSTH:  Landing Ship, Tank, Hospital
 LSU:  Landing Ship, Utility
 LSV:  Landing Ship Vehicle
 LWT:  Amphibious Warping Tug

M 
 MB:  Motor Boat
 MCM:  Mine Countermeasures Ship
 MCS:  Mine Countermeasures Support Ship
 MHA:  Minehunter, Auxiliary
 MHC:  Minehunter, Coastal
 MHI:  Mine Hunter Inshore
 MLC:  Motorized Landing Craft
 MLP:  Mobile Landing Platform (changed to ESD)
 MM:  Minelayer
 MMA:  Minelayer, Auxiliary
 MMC:  Minelayer, Coastal
 MMD:  Minelayer, fast (formerly DM)
 MMF:  Minelayer, Fleet
 MON:  Monitor
 MS:  Minesweeper or Motor ship
 MSA:  Minesweeper, Auxiliary
 MSB:  Minesweeping Boat
 MSC:  Minesweeper, Coastal
 MSD:  Minesweeping drone
 MSF:  Minesweeper, Fleet
 MSI:  Minesweeper, Inshore
 MSL:  Minesweeper, Launch
 MSM:  Minesweeper, Medium
 MSO:  Minesweeper - Ocean
 MSR:  Minesweeper, Riverine
 MSS:  Minesweeper, Special
 MV:  Merchant Vessel

N 

 NR:  Submersible Research Vehicle

P 

 PACV:  Patrol craft, air cushioned vehicle
 PB:  Patrol boat
 PBR:  Patrol boat, River
 PC:  Patrol craft, originally Sub chaser
 PCC:  Patrol craft, coastal
 PCC:  Submarine Chaser, Control
 PCE:  Patrol Escort
 PCEC:  Patrol Escort, Coastal
 PCER:  Patrol Escort, Rescue
 PCF:  Vietnam Patrol Craft Fast
 PCH:  Patrol craft, hydrofoil
 PCS:  Patrol Craft, Sweeper
 PCSC:  Patrol Craft, Submarine Chaser
 PCV:  Primary Control Vessel
 PE:  Eagle boat of World War I
 PF:  World War II frigate, based on British River class.
 PFG:  Original designation of USS Oliver Hazard Perry (FFG-7)
 PG:  Gunboat, later Patrol combatant
 PGH:  Patrol Combatant, Hydrofoil
 PHM:  Patrol, Hydrofoil Missile
 PM:  River Monitor
 PR:  Riverine gun ship
 PT:  Patrol torpedo boat
 PTC: Patrol torpedo boat subchaser
 PTF: Patrol torpedo boat, fast
 PY:  Seagoing gun ship
 PT:  Motor Torpedo Boat (World War II)

S 

 SC:  Cruiser Submarine (retired)
 SF:  Fleet Submarine (retired)
 SM:  Submarine Minelayer (retired)
 SP:  Shore Patrol
 SS: Attack Submarine (Diesel-Electric Power)
 SSA: Auxiliary/Cargo Submarine (Diesel-Electric Power)
 SSAN: Auxiliary/Cargo Submarine (Nuclear Power)
 SSB: Ballistic Missile Submarine (Diesel Electric Power)
 SSBN: Ballistic Missile Submarine (Nuclear-Powered)
 SSC: Coastal Submarine (Diesel-Electric Power), over 150 tons
 SSG: Guided Missile Submarine (Diesel-Electric Power)
 SSGN: Guided Missile Submarine (Nuclear-Powered)
 SSI: Attack Submarine (Diesel Air-Independent Propulsion)
 SSK: Hunter-Killer/ASW Submarine (retired)
 SSM: Midget Submarine, under 150 tons
 SSN: Attack Submarine (Nuclear-Powered)
 SSO: Submarine Oiler (retired)
 SSP: Attack Submarine (Diesel Air-Independent Power) (alternate use), formerly Submarine Transport
 SSQ: Auxiliary Submarine, Communications (retired)
 SSQN: Auxiliary Submarine, Communications (Nuclear-Powered)(retired)
 SSR: Radar Picket Submarine (retired)
 SSRN: Radar Picket Submarine (Nuclear-Powered) (retired)
 SST: Training Submarine (Diesel-Electric Power)

T 
 TCD:  Small LSD
 TGB:  Icebreaking Tug
 TR:  Torpedo Retriever
 TWR:  Torpedo Weapon Retriever

W 

 W: United States Coast Guard

X 

 X:  Submersible Craft, Also used to denote experimental craft.

Y 

 YA:  Ash lighter
 YAGR:  Oceanic radar station
 YAGT:  Target barge
 YC:  Open Lighter
 YCD:  Oil storage barge
 YCF:  Car Float
 YCV:  Aircraft Transportation Lighter
 YD:  Floating Crane
 YDG:  Degaussing tender
 YDT:  Diving Tender
 YE:  Ammunition storage barge
 YF:  Covered Lighter
 YFB:  Ferry Boat or Launch
 YFD:  Yard Floating Dry Dock
 YFN:  Covered Lighter (non-self propelled)
 YFNB:  Large Covered Lighter (non-self propelled)
 YFND:  Dry Dock Companion Craft (non-self propelled)
 YFNX:  Lighter (Special purpose) (non-self propelled)
 YFP:  Floating Power Barge
 YFR:  Refrigerated Cover Lighter
 YFRN:  Refrigerated Covered Lighter (non-self propelled)
 YFRT:  Range Tender
 YFU:  Harbor Utility Craft
 YG:  Garbage Lighter
 YGN:  Garbage Lighter (non-self propelled)
 YH:  Ambulance craft
 YHB:  House boat
 YHLC:  Heavy (salvage) lifting craft
 YHT:  Heading scow
 YLA:  Open lighter, landing
 YLLC:  Salvage Lift Craft
 YM:  Dredge
 YMN:  Dredge (non-self propelled)
 YMS:  Motor Minesweeper, Auxiliary
 YMT:  Motor tug
 YN:  Net tender
 YND:  net tender, district
 YNG:  Gate Craft
 YNT:  Net Tender
 YO:  Fuel Oil Barge
 YOG:  Gasoline Barge
 YOGN:  Gasoline Barge (non-self propelled)
 YON:  Fuel Oil Barge (non-self propelled)
 YOS:  Oil Storage Barge
 YP:  Patrol Craft, Training
 YPD:  Floating Pile Driver
 YR:  Floating Workshop
 YRB:  Repair and Berthing Barge
 YRBM:  Repair, Berthing and Messing Barge
 YRDH:  Floating Dry Dock Workshop (Hull)
 YRDM:  Floating Dry Dock Workshop (Machine)
 YRR:  Radiological Repair Barge
 YRST:  Salvage Craft Tender
 YSD:  Seaplane Wrecking Derrick
 YSR:  Sludge Removal Barge
 YT:  Harbor Tug (craft later assigned YTB, YTM, or YTM classifications)
 YTB:  Large Harbor Tug
 YTL:  Small Harbor Tug
 YTM:  Medium Harbor Tug
 YTR:  Rescue tug
 YTT:  Torpedo Trials Craft
 YV:  UAV recovery craft
 YW:  Water Barge
 YWD:  distilling craft
 YWN:  Water Barge (non-self propelled)

Z 

 ZMC: Airship Metal Clad
 ZNN-G: G-Class Blimp
 ZNN-J: J-Class Blimp
 ZNN-L: L-Class Blimp
 ZNP-K: K-Class Blimp
 ZNP-M: M-Class Blimp
 ZNP-N: N-Class Blimp
 ZPG-3W: surveillance patrol blimp
 ZR: Rigid Airship
 ZRS: Rigid Airship

See also 
 Ship prefix

References 

Hull classifications
Ship names
Hull Z